Églantine Chesneau is a French cartoonist and illustrator.

Biography 
Églantine Chesneau studied at the Rueil-Malmaison School of Fine Arts. Around 2014 to 2015, she worked as a cartoonist for Le Nouvel Observateur.

In 2019, Michel Lafon published her first bande dessinée, 12 301 jours avec ma mamie (12 301 days with my granny). where she where she describes the end of her grandmother's life.

Also in 2019, she ran in the Paris Marathon, which serves as the inspiration for a comic strip describing her preparation for the event, finally released as an album in 2021. The cartoon was being written concurrently as she prepared for the marathon. During her preparation, she met a dozen other amateur athletes who also running their first marathon; these meetings served as her inspiration when writing the comic. Her album has gained popularity France and Belgium.

Publications 
  12 301 jours avec ma mamie, Michel Lafon, 2019 .
 Alors on court : chroniques d'un premier marathon, Michel Lafon, 2021 .

References 

1982 births
Living people
French comics artists
French female comics artists